Assiniboia-Gravelbourg was a provincial electoral district for the Legislative Assembly of Saskatchewan, Canada. This constituency was created from the ridings of Gravelbourg and Assiniboia-Bengough before the 1975 Saskatchewan general election. The constituency was bisected into both the Thunder Creek and Wood River  ridings before the 1995 Saskatchewan general election.

Member of the Legislative Assembly

Election results

|-

|style="width: 130px"|PC
|Connie McLeod
|align="right"|1,517
|align="right"|19.13
|align="right"|-
|- bgcolor="white"
!align="left" colspan=3|Total
!align="right"|7,929
!align="right"|100.00
!align="right"|

|-

|style="width: 130px"|PC
|Wilf Lethbridge
|align="right"|2,331
|align="right"|28.71
|align="right"|+9.57
|- bgcolor="white"
!align="left" colspan=3|Total
!align="right"|8,119
!align="right"|100.00
!align="right"|

|-

|style="width: 130px"|PC
|Rene Archambault
|align="right"|2,438
|align="right"|28.57
|align="right"|-0.13

|- bgcolor="white"
!align="left" colspan=3|Total
!align="right"|8,532

|-

|style="width: 130px"|PC
|Bill Fancourt
|align="right"|2,273
|align="right"|28.72
|align="right"|+0.14
|- bgcolor="white"
!align="left" colspan=3|Total
!align="right"|7,914
!align="right"|100.00
!align="right"|

|-

|style="width: 130px"|PC
|John Thomas Wolfe
|align="right"|3,164
|align="right"|44.31
|align="right"|+15.59

|- bgcolor="white"
!align="left" colspan=3|Total
!align="right"|7,139
!align="right"|100.00
!align="right"|

|-

|style="width: 130px"|PC
|John Thomas Wolfe
|align="right"|2,583
|align="right"|35.00
|align="right"|-9.31

|- bgcolor="white"
!align="left" colspan=3|Total
!align="right"|7,378
!align="right"|100.00
!align="right"|

See also
Electoral district (Canada)
List of Saskatchewan provincial electoral districts
List of Saskatchewan general elections
List of political parties in Saskatchewan

References
 Saskatchewan Archives Board: Saskatchewan Executive and Legislative Directory

Former provincial electoral districts of Saskatchewan